Ash Grove Township, Illinois refers to one of the following places:

 Ash Grove Township, Iroquois County, Illinois
 Ash Grove Township, Shelby County, Illinois

See also

Ash Grove Township (disambiguation)

Illinois township disambiguation pages